The eighth season of Supernatural, an American dark fantasy television series created by Eric Kripke, premiered October 3, 2012, and concluded on May 15, 2013, airing 23 episodes. It is the first season headed by Jeremy Carver as executive producer and showrunner. It aired on Wednesdays at 9:00 pm (ET) on The CW. The season was released on DVD and Blu-ray in region 1 on September 10, 2013, in region 2 on October 28, 2013, and in region 4 on September 25, 2014. The eighth season had an average viewership of 2.12 million U.S. viewers. In the season, Dean reunites with Sam after escaping from Purgatory and team up with the prophet, Kevin, to complete a series of trials that'll allow them to close the gates of Hell for good.

Cast

Starring
 Jared Padalecki as Sam Winchester
 Jensen Ackles as Dean Winchester

Special guest stars
 Misha Collins as Castiel
 DJ Qualls as Garth Fitzgerald IV

Special appearance by
 Jim Beaver as Bobby Singer

Guest stars

Episodes

In this table, the number in the first column refers to the episode's number within the entire series, whereas the number in the second column indicates the episode's number within this particular season. "U.S. viewers in millions" refers to how many Americans watched the episode live or on the day of broadcast.

Production
It was announced on April 4, 2012, that showrunner Sera Gamble was leaving the show to work on developing other projects. Jeremy Carver, a longtime writer on the series, took over as showrunner for the eighth season. On May 3, 2012, The CW officially renewed Supernatural for an eighth season. It aired on Wednesdays at 9:00 pm on the CW. Series star Jensen Ackles directed the first episode to be produced for this season but the third to air. "Trial and Error" was the thirteenth episode to be produced this season but the fourteenth to air.

Casting
Ty Olsson was cast as Benny, a dark and dangerous vampire who helps Ackles' character Dean Winchester escape from Purgatory, where he ended up at the end of the seventh season. Olsson previously appeared in Supernatural as the vampire Eli in the second season episode "Bloodlust". Liane Balaban was cast as Amelia, a love interest to Jared Padalecki's character Sam Winchester. Amanda Tapping appears in seven episodes as the angel Naomi, described as being different from any other angel to have appeared in the series so far. Even though Khaira Ledeyo played the role of Kevin's mother in the seventh season, Lauren Tom was cast in the role for season eight. DJ Qualls returned as the hunter Garth in "Southern Comfort". Felicia Day returned as hacker Charlie Bradbury in "LARP and the Real Girl" and "Pac-Man Fever". Jon Gries returned as Martin Creaser, a hunter and old friend of the Winchesters, in "Citizen Fang", he previously appeared in the fifth season episode "Sam, Interrupted". Jim Beaver reprised his role as Bobby Singer in "Taxi Driver".

Writing

The season features two flashback stories in parallel to the episode's main story, one showing Sam's relationship with Amelia and another showing Dean's time in Purgatory. Originally, series creator Eric Kripke planned only five seasons, but Carver drew up a plan which would carry the series through a total of ten seasons. Executive producer Robert Singer described the inspiration for the season as "Raiders of the Lost Ark".

Reception 
Critical reception to the season was mixed to positive. The review aggregator website Rotten Tomatoes reported a 67% approval rating, with an average rating of 7.35/10 based on 9 reviews. 

Diana Steenbergen of IGN gave the eighth season an 8.5 out of 10 and called it an improvement over the seventh season, writing, "What we got was a solid season-long mythology storyline, some great supporting characters, and of course, a lot of the always reliable backbone of the show – Sam and Dean Winchester." She commented positively about the return of the demons/angels storyline and addition of new recurring characters such as Benny, Naomi, and Metatron, but criticized Sam's "regular life" storyline that got "fizzled" and dropping the tablet trials at the last minute.

References

External links

Supernatural 08
2012 American television seasons
2013 American television seasons